Gočaltovo is a village and municipality in the Rožňava District in the Košice Region of middle-eastern Slovakia.

History
In historical records the village was first mentioned in 1318.

Geography
The village lies at an altitude of 373 metres and covers an area of 10.677 km².
It has a population of about 245 people.

Culture
The village has a public library.

Genealogical resources

The records for genealogical research are available at the state archive "Statny Archiv in Kosice, Slovakia"

 Lutheran church records (births/marriages/deaths): 1782-1952 (parish B)

See also
 List of municipalities and towns in Slovakia

External links
https://web.archive.org/web/20071217080336/http://www.statistics.sk/mosmis/eng/run.html
Surnames of living people in Gocaltovo

Villages and municipalities in Rožňava District